The Little Medicine Bow River is a  tributary of the Medicine Bow River in Wyoming. The basin of the Little Medicine Bow includes the northern slopes of the Shirley Mountains as well Shirley Basin.

See also 
 List of Wyoming rivers

References

External links

Rivers of Wyoming
Rivers of Carbon County, Wyoming